This lists private schools in the U.S. state of Washington. For a list of private schools in the U.S. capital Washington, D.C., see List of parochial and private schools in Washington, D.C.

This is a list of private schools in Washington. As of the 2011-2012 school year, there were 517 approved private schools in the state of Washington.

Adams County
Othello
Mid Columbia Christian School
Saddle Mountain School
Warden
Warden Hutterian School

Asotin County
Clarkston
Holy Family School
The Ohana Education Center

Benton County
Kennewick
Bethlehem Lutheran School
Calvary Christian School
St. Joseph's School
Richland
Children's Garden Montessori
Christ the King School
Liberty Christian School

Chelan County
Leavenworth
Upper Valley Christian School
Wenatchee
Cascade Christian Academy
St. Joseph's School
St. Paul's Lutheran School
Wenatchee Montessori Elementary

Clallam County
Port Angeles
Olympic Christian School
Queen of Angels School
Sequim
Five Acre School
Mountain View Christian School

Clark County
Battle Ground
Columbia Adventist Academy
Firm Foundation Christian School
Meadowglade SDA School
Camas
Pacific Crest Academy
Spanish with Sarah
Bright Futures Christian School
Ridgefield
Cedar Tree Classical Christian School 
Mountain View Christian School
Vancouver
Cascadia School
Cornerstone Christian School
Gardner School of Arts and Sciences
Hosanna Christian School
King's Way Christian School
Our Lady of Lourdes School
Seton Catholic College Preparatory High School
Skinner Elementary Montessori School  (formerly Skinner Montessori School) (2009)
Slavic Christian Academy-Vancouver
St. Joseph School
Washougal
Riverside Christian School

Cowlitz County
Kelso
Family House Academy
Kelso Longview Adventist School
Three Rivers Christian School
Longview
St. Rose School
Three Rivers Christian School-Longview Elem

Franklin County
Pasco
Country Haven Academy
Kingspoint Christian School
St. Patrick School
Tri-Cities Prep
Tri-City Junior Academy

Grant County
Ephrata
New Life Christian School
St. Rose of Lima School
Moses Lake
Crestview Christian School
Moses Lake Christian Academy
Quincy
Quincy Valley School
Warden
Marlin Hutterite School

Grays Harbor County
Aberdeen
St. Mary School
Montesano
Grays Harbor Adventist Christian School

Island County
Clinton
Whidbey Island Waldorf School
Langley
Island Christian Academy
Oak Harbor
Der Kinderhuis Montessori
Doodlebugs Academy
North Whidbey Christian High
Oak Harbor Christian School

Jefferson County
Port Hadlock
Cedarbrook Adventist Christian
Sunfield Waldorf School
Port Townsend
Jefferson Community School
Swan School

King County
Auburn
Spring Academy
Auburn Adventist Academy
Buena Vista SDA School
Green River Montessori School
Holy Family School
Rainier Christian Middle School
Rainier Christian Elementary-Kent View
Rainier Christian Preschool-Little People
Valley Christian School
Overcomer Academy 
Bellevue
Academic Institute
America's Child Montessori
Bellevue Children's Academy
Bellevue Children's Academy  2nd Location
Bellevue Montessori School
Bel-Red Bilingual Academy
BK Play Academy for Gifted Children
Brightmont Academy
Cedar Park Christian School
Chestnut Hill Academy South Campus
Dartmoor School 
Eastside Academy
Eastside Christian School
Eastside Learning Community
Emerald Heights Academy
Eton School
Forest Ridge School of Sacred Heart
French Immersion School of Washington
Hillside Student Community School 
Jewish Day School
Living Montessori Academy 
Newport Children's School
Open Window School
Shamrock Montessori
St. Louise School
St. Madeleine Sophie School
The Eastside Montessori School
The Little School
Three Cedars Waldorf School
Bothell
Cedar Park Christian School
Evergreen Academy
Heritage Christian Academy
St. Brendan School
The Clearwater School
UCiC School
Whole Earth Montessori School
Woodinville Montessori School

Burien
Glendale Lutheran School
JF Kennedy Catholic High School
Praise Christian Academy
St. Francis of Assisi School
Three Tree Montessori
Clyde Hill
Bellevue Christian School
Sacred Heart School
Covington
Kentwood Christian Academy
Rainier Christian High School
Des Moines
Evergreen Lutheran High School
Holy Trinity Lutheran School
Legacy Classical Christian Academy 
St. Philomena School
Duvall
Hillside Academy
Enumclaw
Cascade Independent High School
Cedar River Academy
Federal Way
Brooklake Christian School
Christian Faith School
Holy Innocents School of NW
Spring Valley Montessori
St. Vincent De Paul School
Issaquah
Cougar Mountain Academy
Dartmoor School—Issaquah
Pacific Learning Academy
Sammamish Christian School & Noah's Ark
Snoqualmie Springs School
St. Joseph Catholic School of Issaquah
Kenmore
Veritas Academy
Kirkland
Cedar Crest Academy
Countryside Montessori School
Eastside Preparatory School
Holy Family Parish School
Kirkland SDA School
Puget Sound Adventist Academy
Lake Forest Park
Sno-King Academy 
Maple Valley
Blossoming Hill Montessori
Medina
Saint Thomas School 
Three Points Elementary
Mercer Island
American Academy
Child School
ETC Preparatory Academy
French American School of Puget Sound
Northwest Yeshiva High School
Privett Academy
St. Monica School
North Bend
North Bend Montessori Inc
Spanish Academy  
Summit Classical Christian School
Redmond
Cascadia Montessori School
Faith Lutheran School of Redmond
Medina Academy
Montessori Children's House
Overlake School
Spectrum Academy 
The Bear Creek School
The Sammamish Montessori School
Renton
Cedar River Montessori School
New Horizon School
Northwest Free School
Rainier Christian Schools-Maple Valley Elementary
Rainier Christian Schools-Maple Valley Preschool
Renton Christian School
St. Anthony School
Sammamish
Brightmont Academy
Eastside Catholic School
Eastside Montessori Education Foundation dba Arbor Schools 
TLC Academy
Seattle

Academy for Precision Learning 
Alcuin School
Amazing Grace Christian School
Assumption St. Bridget
Bertschi School
Billings Middle School
Bishop Blanchet High School
Bright Water School
Brightmont Academy
Christ the King School
Concordia Lutheran School
Dartmoor School—Seattle
Epiphany School
Explorer West Middle School
Fairview Christian School                                                     
Family Academy/Academy NW
First Place
Giddens School
Hamlin Robinson School
Holy Family School
Holy Names Academy
Holy Rosary Elementary
Hope Lutheran School
Islamic School of Seattle
Kapka Cooperative School 
King's Schools
Koinonia Learning Academy
Lake Forest Park Montessori
Lake WA Girls Middle School
Lakeside School
Laurel Academy
Matheia School
Meridian School
MMSC Day School
Morningside Academy
Northwest Montessori
Northwest School
O'Dea High School
Our Lady of Fatima School
Our Lady of Guadalupe School
Our Lady Of The Lake School
Pacific Crest Schools
Perkins School
Puget Sound Community School
Seattle Academy of Arts/Sciences
Seattle Area German American School
Seattle Christian School
Seattle Country Day School
Seattle Girls' School
Seattle Hebrew Academy
Seattle Jewish Community School
Seattle Lutheran High School
Seattle Prep/Matteo Ricci College
Seattle Urban Academy
Seattle Waldorf School
Shoreline Christian School
Shorewood Christian School
Sound View Education
Spring Academy
Spruce Street School
St. Alphonsus School
St. Anne School
St. Benedict School
St. Bernadette School
St. Catherine School
St. Christopher Academy
St. Edwards School
St. George School
St. John School
St. Joseph School
St. Matthew School
St. Paul School
St. Therese School
The Bush School
The Lake and Park School
Tilden School
Torah Day School of Seattle
University Child Development School
University Cooperative School
University Preparatory
Valley School
Villa Academy
West Seattle Montessori School
Westside School
Work It Out
Zion Preparatory Academy
Shoreline
The Evergreen School
Horizon School
Living Wisdom School of Seattle
Northwest School For Hearing Impaired
Pacific Learning Center NW
St. Luke School
St. Mark School
Tukwila
Academy Schools/Children’s Academy
Vashon
Carpe Diem Primary School, Inc.
Harbor School
Woodinville
Bellevue Christian Mack Elementary
Brock's Academy 
Chrysalis School
Dartmoor School
Dolan Academy & Learning Center
Northwest Liberty School

Kitsap County
Bainbridge Island
Bellevue Christian Mack Elementary
Brock's Academy
Chrysalis School
Dartmoor School
Dolan Academy & Learning Center
Northwest Liberty School 
Bremerton
Alta Vista School
Christ the King Lutheran School
Crosspoint Academy 
Discovery Depot Montessori
Kitsap Adventist Christian School
Our Lady Star of the Sea School
Peace Lutheran School
Port Orchard
Bethany Lutheran Elementary
Burley Christian School
Discovery Montessori
South Kitsap Christian School
Poulsbo
Gateway Christian Schools 
Martha &  Mary Children's Learning Center
Poulsbo SDA School
Silverwood School
West Sound Academy

Kittitas County
Ellensburg
Ellensburg Christian School
White Salmon
Little Oak Montessori School

Klickitat County
Goldendale
Goldendale Christian School

Lewis County
Centralia
Cedar Valley Academy 
Centralia Christian
Evergreen Academy of Arts & Sciences
Chehalis
Lewis County Adventist School
St. Joseph School

Lincoln County
Edwall
Christian Heritage School
Odessa
Rock Creek Hutterite
Stahlville School
Reardan
Deep Creek Hutterian School
Spokane
Countryside SDA Elementary

Mason County
Shelton
Mason County Christian School
Mt. Olive Lutheran School
Shelton Valley Christian School

Okanogan County
Omak
Omak Adventist Christian School
Oroville
North Country Christian School
Tonasket
Peaceful Valley Christian School
Winthrop
Methow Valley Community School

Pierce County
Edgewood
Skys The Limit Montessori
Slavic Christian Academy
Fife
All Saints School
Gig Harbor
Gig Harbor Academy
Harbor Christian Schools
Harbor Montessori School
Lighthouse Christian School
St. Nicholas School
Graham
Freedom Academy
South Sound Christian Schools-New Hope Campus
Lakewood
Lakewood Lutheran School
St. Frances Cabrini School
St. Mary's Episcopal School 
Puyallup
All Saints School
Cascade Christian Junior High and High School
Cascade Christian Schools
Northwest Christian School
Tacoma
Annie Wright Schools
Bellarmine Preparatory School
Cascade Christian Schools-Fredrickson Elementary
Cascade Christian Schools-Tacoma Elementary
Community Montessori 
Concordia Lutheran School
Covenant High School
Faith Lutheran School
First Presbyterian Church School
Holy Rosary School
Imagination School of Education
Life Christian School
Mt. Rainier Lutheran High School
Parkland Lutheran School
Puget Sound Christian School
Seabury School
Seabury School—Middle School Campus
Slavic Christian Academy—Tacoma 
South Sound Christian Schools-Tacoma Baptist Campus
St. Charles Borromeo School
St. Mary's Academy
St. Patrick School
Tacoma Waldorf School
Visitation School
University Place
Charles Wright Academy
Heritage Christian School

San Juan County
Eastsound
Orcas Christian School
Salmonberry School
Friday Harbor
Spring Street International School
Stillpoint School

Skagit County
Burlington
Skagit Adventist Academy
Mount Vernon
Immaculate Conception Regional School
Mount Vernon Christian School
Foothills Christian School

Snohomish County
Arlington
Academy NW/Family Academy
Arlington Christian School
Highland Christian Schools
Bothell
Light of Faith Christian Academy
Edmonds
Crescendo Artistic Environment
Holy Rosary
Solomon Christian School
Stella Maris Academy
Everett
Archbishop Thomas J. Murphy High School
Calvary Christian Academy
Cedar Park Christian School
Everett Christian School
Forest Park Adventist School
Greater Trinity Christian Learning Academy
Immaculate Conception/Our Lady of Perpetual Help
Montessori Schools of Snohomish Co.
Northshore Christian Academy
St. Mary Magdalen School
Lake Stevens
Hillcrest Academy
Zion Lutheran School
Lynnwood
Brighton School
Cedar Park Christian School
Cypress Adventist School
Providence Classical Christian School
Redemption Lutheran School (K-8)
The Soundview School 
St. Thomas More School
Marysville
Grace Academy
Monroe
Cornerstone Academy
Monroe Christian School
Monroe Montessori School
Theresa and Elizabeths School
Mountlake Terrace
Cedar Park Christian School
St. Pius X School
Mukilteo
Mukilteo Academy
Providence Christian School
Snohomish
Lakeview Academy
Peaceful Glen Christian School
St. Michael Catholic School
Stanwood
Cedarhome Adventist Christian School
Summit Academy

Spokane County
Colbert
Northwest Christian School
Mead
Faith Christian School
Newman Lake
Shamrock Educational Academy
Spangle
Upper Columbia Academy
Upper Columbia Academy Elementary 
Spokane
All Saints Catholic School
Assumption School
Calvary Chapel Christian School
Can Learn Academy
Cataldo School
Cornerstone Christian Academy
First Presbyterian Christian School
Gonzaga Preparatory School
North Wall Elementary
Northwest Christian School
Palisades Christian Academy 
River Day School
Saint George's School
Slavic Christian Academy—Spokane 
Southside Christian School
Spokane Christian Academy
St. Aloysius Catholic School
St. Charles School
St. Matthew Lutheran School
Saint Michael's Academy
St. Patrick Catholic School
St. Thomas More School
Trinity Catholic School
Westgate Christian School
Spokane Valley
Pioneer School
Prism School
Spokane Valley Adventist School
St. John Vianney School
St. Mary's Catholic School
The Oaks Classical Christian Academy
Valley Christian School

Stevens County
Colville
Colville Valley Junior Academy
Johnson Christian School

Thurston County
Lacey
Community Christian Academy
Faith Lutheran School
Holy Family School
Northwest Christian High School
Pope John Paul II High School
Olympia
Cornerstone Christian School
Evergreen Christian School
Gospel Outreach
Nova School
Olympia Christian School
Olympia Community School
Olympia Waldorf School
Rising Tide School
St. Michael School
Sunrise Beach School
The Children's Inn Academy
Tumwater
Serendipity Academy at the Lodge  
Yelm
Eagle View Christian School

Walla Walla County
College Place
Rogers Adventist School
Walla Walla Valley Academy
Walla Walla
Assumption Grade School
DeSales Catholic School
Liberty Christian School
St. Basil Academy of Classical Studies

Whatcom County
Bellingham
Assumption Catholic School
Baker View Christian School
Bellingham Christian School
Bridgeway Christian Academy
Cascades Montessori Middle School
Cedar Tree Montessori
Explorations Academy/Global Community Institute
Gardenview Montessori
Home Port Learning Center
Lynden Christian Schools - Evergreen campus
Montessori at Samish Woods 
St. Paul's Academy            
WellSpring Community School
Whatcom Day Academy
Whatcom Hills Waldorf
Ferndale
Pioneer Meadows Montessori School 
Providence Christian School Northwest
Lynden
Cornerstone Christian School
Covenant Christian School
Ebenezer Christian School
Lynden Christian Schools
Sedro-Wooley
Alger Learning Center

Whitman County
Colton
Guardian Angel St. Boniface School
Pullman
Pullman Christian School
Royal Garrison School

Yakima County
Grandview
Grandview Adventist Junior Academy
Harrah
Harrah Community Christian School
Naches
Nile Christian School/Hope Academy
Selah
Selah Covenant Christian School 
Sunnyside
Sunnyside Christian School
Trinity Reformed Christian School
Union Gap
La Salle High School
Yakima
Grace Lutheran School
Green Pastures Learning Center
Montessori School of Yakima
Oakridge Ranch - Montessori Farm School
Riverside Christian School
St. John of Kronstadt Orthodox Christian School
St. Joseph Marquette Middle School
Saint Paul Cathedral School
Westpark Christian Academy 
Yakima Adventist Christian School
Zillah
Christian Worship Center Elementary

References

Private schools in Washington (state)
Private